Clifford Alwrid Hamlow (born April 11, 1934) is a former mayor of Glendora, California.

Hamlow was elected to the Glendora City Council in 2002 as a result of a recall election. He served as the mayor in 2004-2005 before getting voted out in the 2005 election.

Hamlow currently serves on the Glendora Planning Commission and is the president, commissioner, and secretary of the Golden State Athletic Conference Region II.

References

Living people
Mayors of Glendora, California
1934 births
People from Turlock, California